The 2022 U Sports Women's Final 8 Basketball Tournament was held March 31 to April 3, 2022, in Kingston, Ontario, to determine a national champion for the 2021–22 U Sports women's basketball season. This was the first tournament held since 2020 due to the COVID-19 pandemic in Canada. This year's tournament was originally scheduled for March 10 to March 13, 2022, but was delayed three weeks due to ongoing pandemic issues.

The tournament saw the Ryerson Rams crowned as champions, the school's first U Sports national title. Ryerson beat Winnipeg, which took the silver medal, while Queen's beat Brock for the bronze.

Host
The tournament was being hosted by Queen's University at its Athletic and Recreation Centre (ARC), the first time Queen's hosted the championship game. Queen's had originally been awarded hosting duties for the 2021 U Sports Women's Basketball Championship, but the tournament was cancelled due to the ongoing COVID-19 pandemic in Canada.

Participating teams

Championship bracket

Consolation bracket

References

External links 
 Tournament Web Site

U Sports Women's Basketball Championship
2021–22 in Canadian basketball
2022 in women's basketball
Queen's University at Kingston